The Third Legion can refer any of these Roman Legions:

Legio III Augusta
Legio III Cyrenaica
Legio III Diocletiana
Legio III Gallica
Legio III Isaura
Legio III Italica
Legio III Parthica

See also
3rd Legion Tercio "Don Juan de Austria" regiment of the Spanish Legion
3rd Legion First Encirclement Campaign against Jiangxi Soviet 
3rd Legion of the Vistula (Poles) Battle of Alcañiz